The 2002 Carlisle City Council election took place on 2 May 2002 to elect members of Carlisle District Council in Cumbria, England. One third of the council was up for election and the Conservative Party stayed in overall control of the council.

After the election, the composition of the council was:
Conservative 27
Labour 18
Liberal Democrats 5
Independent 2

Election result
The Conservatives retained a majority on the council, despite losing 2 seats to Labour. Overall turnout at the election was 31.7%.

Ward results

References

2002 English local elections
2002
2000s in Cumbria